Soligorskopterus is a genus of eurypterid, a group of extinct aquatic arthropods. Fossils of Soligorskopterus have been discovered in deposits from the Late Devonian. The genus contains two species: S. tchepeliensis, the type species, from the Middle Famennian stage of Belarus, and S. shpinevi, from the Lower Frasnian stage of Russia. Its name derives from Soligorsk, the closest city from the fossil site of the type species, and the Greek word πτερόν (pteron), which means wing.

See also
 List of eurypterid genera
 Timeline of eurypterid research

References

Devonian eurypterids
Eurypterids of Europe
Frasnian life
Famennian life
Fossils of Russia
Fossil taxa described in 2018
Stylonuroidea